Khan Kluay is a Thai computer-animated feature film franchise set during Ayutthaya-era Siam about an elephant who wanders away from his mother and eventually becomes the war elephant for King Naresuan. It is based on "Chao Praya Prab Hongsawadee" by Ariya Jintapanichkarn. A PC game called Khankluay:The Adventure has also been released in Thailand.

It was officially released as Jumbo in India and The Blue Elephant in the United States.

by 2018, elefantsya was only released in Ukraine and not in the Former Soviet Union & Russia.

Characters and Cast 

Thai animation
Fictional elephants